Carr Township is one of twelve townships in Jackson County, Indiana, United States. As of the 2010 census, its population was 1,510 and it contained 645 housing units.

Carr Township was named for Thomas Carr, an early county commissioner.

History
Carr High School and Medora Covered Bridge are listed on the National Register of Historic Places.

Geography
The streams of Dry Creek and Greasy Creek run through this township.

Cities and towns
 Medora

Unincorporated towns
 Sparksville
 Weddleville
(This list is based on USGS data and may include former settlements.)

Adjacent townships
 Owen Township (north)
 Brownstown Township (northeast)
 Driftwood Township (east)
 Jefferson Township, Washington County (south)
 Brown Township, Washington County (southwest)
 Guthrie Township, Lawrence County (west)

Cemeteries
The township contains ten cemeteries: Beem, Brown, Goss, Heighton Hill, Hinderlider, Holmes, Lanning Spur, Shoemaker, Stewart and Zollman.

Major highways
  Indiana State Road 235

References
 
 United States Census Bureau cartographic boundary files

External links
 Indiana Township Association
 United Township Association of Indiana

Townships in Jackson County, Indiana
Townships in Indiana